Assonet may refer to:

 Assonet, Massachusetts
 Assonet River
 Assonet Bay